Luacano is a town and municipality in Moxico Province, Angola. The municipality had a population of 20,755 in 2014.

The Luacano River (Rio Luacano) flows past the town to the west before entering the Kasai River, which forms the border between Moxico and Luanda Sul.
During negotiations over the border between the Belgian Congo and Portuguese Angola the Belgians pushed for making the Luacano River part of the border.

Transport 

In 2012, a long-awaited short cut between the Angola's Benguela Railway and the Zambian copper mines is being built.  The short cut leaves the mainline east of Luacano.

See also 

 Railway stations in Zambia

References 

 

Populated places in Moxico Province